Bruno Limido (born 7 March 1961) is an Italian former footballer who played as a midfielder.

External links

1961 births
Living people
Italian footballers
Serie A players
Serie B players
Serie C players
S.S.D. Varese Calcio players
U.S. Avellino 1912 players
Juventus F.C. players
Atalanta B.C. players
Bologna F.C. 1909 players
U.S. Lecce players
A.C. Cesena players
A.S.D. SolbiaSommese Calcio players
Association football midfielders